Aristocrunk is the debut album by crunk rap group Lord T & Eloise, released in 2006 by Young Avenue Records.

Album information
The title of the album is in reference to the unique style of the band, which is the first legitimate rap group to represent the perspective of the uber-wealthy. The album notes describe the band as "genetically engineered over generations of obscure royalty". It also says that "they have emerged from the past to save the present, waiting for the right moment to spread their gospel of the good life".

Track listing

References

Lord T & Eloise albums
2006 debut albums